Hwad Ibrahim Abdel Hamid Lumomba (born 1948) is a Sudanese boxer. He competed in the 1968 Summer Olympics.

References

1948 births
Living people
People from Al Jazirah (state)
Boxers at the 1968 Summer Olympics
Sudanese male boxers
Olympic boxers of Sudan
Featherweight boxers